The Austro-Hungarian Fifth Army was an Austro-Hungarian field army that fought during World War I.

Actions 
The Fifth Army was formed in 1914 as part of Austro-Hungarian mobilization following its declaration of war on Serbia and Russia. The Fifth Army was put under the command of Gen. Liborius Ritter von Frank. Between August and December 1914, it fought in the Serbian Campaign and suffered such enormous casualties that it was disbanded on 27 December 1914.

It participated in the :
 Battle of Cer (August 1914), 
 Battle of Drina (September - October 1914)
 Battle of Kolubara (November - December 1914).

The Fifth Army was reestablished in May 1915 on the Italian Front, where it remained active until the end of the War. 
On 24 May 1917, it was renamed the Isonzo Army.
On 23 August 1917, the Isonzo Army was upgraded to Army Group Boroević (Heeresgruppe "Boroević") which was composed of 2 armies: 
 First Isonzo Army, under command of Wenzel von Wurm.
 Second Isonzo Army, under command of Johann Ritter von Henriquez. 
In January 1918 the Army Group was composed of   
 Isonzo Army, under command of Wenzel von Wurm.
 Sixth Army, under command of Archduke Joseph August of Austria.

It participated in the 
 Battles of the Isonzo (May 1915 - September 1917)
 Battle of Caporetto (October 1917 - November 1917)
 Battle of the Piave River (June 1918)
 Battle of Vittorio Veneto (October–November 1918)

Commanders
 Liborius Ritter von Frank : August 14–27 December 1914
 Svetozar Boroević : 27 May 1915 - 3 November 1918

Sources 
 Austro-Hungarian Army, Higher Commands and Commanders 

Field armies of Austria-Hungary
1914 establishments in Austria-Hungary
1915 establishments in Austria-Hungary
Military units and formations established in 1914
Military units and formations disestablished in 1914
Military units and formations established in 1916
Military units and formations disestablished in 1918